Treco, also credited as Treco Corporation Limited, American Treco and Treco, USA, was a game developer and publisher located in Torrance, California. Treco produced games for the Sega Genesis/Mega Drive from 1990 to 1993. Treco was a subsidiary of Sammy Corporation.

After UPL Company Limited went bankrupt, Treco would port some of their games to the Sega Genesis platform.

Games
 Warsong (1991): English translation of the NCS/Masaya game Langrisser I
 Fighting Masters (1991)
 Sorcerer's Kingdom (1992), (1993): English translation of the NCS game Sorcer Kingdom

Arcade ports
Treco produced Mega Drive ports of the following arcade games:
 Atomic Robo-Kid (1990)
 Street Smart (1991)
 Task Force Harrier EX (1991)
 Twin Cobra (1991)

References
 

Defunct video game companies of the United States
Sega Sammy Holdings